Svein Norman Hansen (18 April 1943 – 14 August 2012) was a Norwegian ice hockey player. He played for the Norwegian national ice hockey team, and  participated at the Winter Olympics in 1964, 1968 and 1972.

References

External links 
 

1943 births
2012 deaths
Ice hockey players at the 1964 Winter Olympics
Ice hockey players at the 1968 Winter Olympics
Ice hockey players at the 1972 Winter Olympics
Norwegian ice hockey players
Olympic ice hockey players of Norway
Ice hockey people from Oslo